Gubin Do (Serbian Cyrillic: Губин До) is a village located in the Užice municipality of Serbia. In the 2002 census, the village had a population of 451.

Užice
Populated places in Zlatibor District